John Hardyng (or Harding; 1378–1465) was an English chronicler. He was born in Northern England.

Biography
As a boy Hardyng entered the service of Sir Henry Percy (Hotspur), with whom he was present at the Battle of Shrewsbury (1403). He then passed into the service of Sir Robert Umfraville, under whom he was constable of Warkworth Castle, Northumberland, and Kyme Castle, Lincolnshire. He was in Umfraville's retinue at the Battle of Agincourt in 1415 and in the sea-fight before Harfleur in 1416.

In 1424 Hardyng was at Rome, where at the instance of Cardinal Beaufort he consulted the chronicle of Gnaeus Pompeius Trogus. Upon the death of Umfraville in 1436, Hardyng retired to the Augustinian Priory at Kyme, where he wrote the two versions of his chronicle and where he probably lived till his death about 1465. Hardyng was a man of antiquarian knowledge, and under Henry V was employed to investigate the feudal relations of Scotland to the English crown. For this purpose he visited Scotland. By his own account, he spent three and a half years mapping the terrain and securing documents related to English sovereignty. Later, he would incorporate material from his Scottish mission, most notably the first independent map of Scotland, into a history of Britain written for Henry V's son.

For his services he says that Henry V promised Hardyng the manor of Geddington in Northamptonshire. Many years after, in 1440, he had a grant of £10 a year for similar services. In 1457 there is a record of the delivery of documents relating to Scotland by Hardyng to the earl of Shrewsbury, and his reward by a further pension of £20.

It is clear that Hardyng was well acquainted with Scotland, and James I is said to have offered him a bribe to surrender his papers. But most of the documents, which are still preserved in the Record Office, have been shown to be forgeries, and were probably manufactured by Hardyng himself.

Hardyng spent many years on the composition of a rhyming chronicle of England. His services under the Percies and Umfraville's gave him opportunity to obtain much information of value for fifteenth century history. It was written and rewritten to suit his various patrons. The original edition ending in 1437 had a Lancastrian bias and was dedicated to Henry VI and his family. Afterwards he began preparing a version for Richard, Duke of York, and continued the chronicle for Richard's son, Edward IV. A reference to Edward's wife, Elizabeth Woodville, in the prologue indicates that Hardyng was still working on his second version in 1464.

Versions
The first version is preserved in Lansdowne manuscript 204 in the British Library, and the best of the later versions in Oxford, Bodleian Library, Arch. Selden B. 10. Richard Grafton printed two editions in January 1543 and Stow, who was acquainted with a different version, censured Grafton on this point somewhat unjustly. Sir Henry Ellis published the longer version of Grafton with some additions from the Selden and Harley manuscripts in 1812. Professors Sarah Peverley and James Simpson have edited the first chronicles, and Peverley is editing the second version.

Further reading
Articles on Hardyng and his Chronicle:

Edwards, A. S. G., ‘The Manuscripts and Texts of the Second Version of John Hardyng’s Chronicle’, in England in the Fifteenth Century: Proceedings of the Harlaxton Symposium, ed. by Daniel Williams (Woodbridge, 1987), pp. 75–84.
Ellis, Henry, ed., The Chronicle of John Hardyng (London, 1812).
Hiatt, Alfred, ‘Beyond a Border: The Maps of Scotland in John Hardyng’s Chronicle’, in The Lancastrian Court: Proceedings of the 2001 Harlaxton Symposium (Shaun Tyas: Donington, 2003), pp. 78–94.
Hiatt, Alfred, The Making of Medieval Forgeries: False Documents in Fifteenth-Century England. The British Library, 2004 .
Kennedy, Edward Donald, 'John Hardyng and the Holy Grail', Arthurian Literature, 8 (1989), 185–206.
Kennedy, Edward Donald, 'Malory and his English Sources', in Aspects of Malory, ed. by Toshiyuki Takamiya and Derek Brewer (Cambridge, 1981), pp. 27–55, 196–200.
Kennedy, Edward Donald, Chronicles and Other Historical Writing, vol. VIII of A Manual of the Writings in Middle English 1050–1500, ed. by Albert E. Hartung and J. B. Severs (New Haven, 1989).
Kennedy, Edward Donald, 'Visions of history: Robert de Boron and English Arthurian chroniclers', in The Fortunes of King Arthur, ed. by Norris J. Lacy (Cambridge: 2005).
Kingsford, Charles L., ‘The First Version of Hardyng’s Chronicle’, English Historical Review, 27 (1912), 462–82 [1912b].
Peverley, Sarah L., 'John Hardyng's Chronicle: A Study of the Two Versions and a Critical Edition of Both for the Period 1327–1464’ (University of Hull, Ph.D., 2004).
Peverley, Sarah L., ‘Dynasty and Division: The Depiction of King and Kingdom in John Hardyng’s Chronicle’, in The Medieval Chronicle III: Proceedings of the 3rd International Conference on the Medieval Chronicle Doorn/Utrecht 12 – 17 July 2002, ed. by Erik Kooper (Rodopi, Amsterdam, 2004), pp. 149–70.
Peverley, Sarah L., ‘Adapting to Readeption in 1470–1471: The Scribe as Editor in a Unique Copy of John Hardyng’s Chronicle of England (Garrett MS. 142)’, The Princeton University Library Chronicle, 66:1 (2004), 140–72.
Peverley, Sarah L., ‘‘A Good Exampell to Avoide Diane’: Reader Responses to John Hardyng's Chronicle in the Fifteenth and Sixteenth Centuries’, Poetica, 63 (2005), 19–35.
Peverley, Sarah L., ‘Political Consciousness and the Literary Mind in Late Medieval England: ‘Men “Brought up of Nought” in Vale, Hardyng, Mankind, and Malory,’ Studies in Philology, 105 (2008), 1–29. 
Peverley, Sarah L., ‘Chronicling the Fortunes of Kings: John Hardyng’s use of Walton’s Boethius, Chaucer’s Troilus and Criseyde, and Lydgate’s “King Henry VI’s Triumphal Entry into London”’, The Medieval Chronicle VII (2011), 167-203.
Peverley, Sarah L., ‘Genealogy and John Hardyng’s Verse Chronicle’, in Broken Lines: Genealogical Literature in Late-Medieval Britain and France, ed. by Raluca L. Radulescu and Edward Donald Kennedy, Medieval Texts and Cultures of Northern Europe 16 (Turnhout: Brepols, 2008), pp. 259–82.
Peverley, Sarah L., 'Anglo-Scottish Relations in John Hardyng's Chronicle’, in The Anglo-Scottish Border and the Shaping of Identity, 1300-1600, ed. by Mark P. Bruce and Katherine H. Terrell (New York: Palgrave Macmillan, 2012), pp. 69–86.
Riddy, Felicity, ‘Glastonbury, Joseph of Arimathea and the Grail in John Hardyng’s Chronicle’, in The Archaeology and History of Glastonbury Abbey, ed. by Lesley Abrams and James P. Carley (Woodbridge, 1991), pp. 317–31.
Riddy, Felicity, ‘John Hardyng in Search of the Grail’, in Arturus Rex, ed. by W. Van Hoecke (Leuven, 1991), pp. 419–29.
Riddy, Felicity, ‘John Hardyng’s Chronicle and the Wars of the Roses’, Arthurian Literature, 12 (1996), 91–108.
Simpson, James, and Sarah Peverley, eds., John Hardyng, Chronicle: Edited from British Library MS Lansdowne 204, Vol 1 (Kalamazoo: Medieval Institute Publications, 2015).

Notes

References
Simpson, James, and Sarah Peverley, eds. John Hardyng, Chronicle: Edited from British Library MS Lansdowne 204, Vol 1 (Kalamazoo: Medieval Institute Publications, 2015).

1378 births
1465 deaths
15th-century English historians
People of the Hundred Years' War
English male non-fiction writers
Wars of the Roses